Max-Mo is a unique impro jazz/ funk/poetry and spoken-word collective based in Adelaide, South Australia.

The group was formed in March 2009 by founding musicians Steve Matters (composer, keyboards, programmer, bassist, guitarist, trombonist), Andy Mills (drums & percussion), Derek Pascoe (tenor sax) and performers Mike Ladd, Amelia Walker and Rob Walker (not related) – all published and successful individual poets. The group premiered at Poetry Australia’s salt on the tongue National Conference in Goolwa, on 24 April 2010. Max-Mo played in various Adelaide venues over the years, and was broadcast on ABC Radio National’s Poetica programme, Triple R's Aural Text program Radio Adelaide and ABC Local Radio.

Max-Mo is an abbreviation of "maximum momentum".

References

External links 
 Songs - MySpace
• Sticky Carpets: Jazz And Poetry, A Personal View by Mike Ladd, 26 June 2013

Spoken word